Money Museum may refer to:
 ANA Money Museum, at the headquarters of the American Numismatic Association in Colorado Springs, Colorado
 The Money Museum, at the Federal Reserve Bank of Chicago
 The Learning Center and Money Museum, at the Federal Reserve Bank of Cleveland
 The Money Museum, at the Federal Reserve Bank of Kansas City
 Money Museum of the Deutsche Bundesbank in Frankfurt am Main
 MoneyMuseum (Zurich)
 Museum on the Mound, a money museum in the headquarters of HBOS

Museums of economics